Nizamabad Airport is a proposed greenfield airport in Jakranpalli in Nizamabad district in the Indian state of Telangana.

History
In 2008, the government of undivided Andhra Pradesh invited for expressions of interest to develop eight minor airports in the state, including an airport at Nizamabad. Each airport was expected to cost .

In July 2009, the government has scrapped the plans as no companies posted bids for the construction of the airport. The companies sought the construction to be infeasible due to low expectation of revenues. The government has offered additional incentives including exemption from value added taxes and waiver of lease rentals for the first seven years once the airport is operational. The Indian Air Force (IAF) had also objected to the proposal citing disruption of military aircraft movements due to commercial air activity.

The Airports Authority of India (AAI) inspected the  site and gave its approval for the site in June 2013. The cost of construction of the airport would be borne by the state government.

However, in March 2015, the government of Telangana asked its infrastructure and investment department to put the development of Nizamabad airport on hold due to lack of funds and restrictions imposed on developing new airports within  radius of Rajiv Gandhi International Airport at Hyderabad. Development of the airport would be considered at a later date.

Later in 2016, the government has finalised proposals for new airports in the state. Chief Minister K. Chandrasekhar Rao has given his nod for land acquisition for setting up airport in Nizamabad. Doubts were raised over securing approval for the airport since it cannot meet the norms of having a minimum aerial distance of  another airport which is already proposed in Warangal.

References

Nizamabad, Telangana
Airports in Telangana
Proposed airports in Telangana